A short-range ballistic missile (SRBM) is a ballistic missile with a range of about  or less. In past and potential regional conflicts, these missiles have been and would be used because of the short distances between some countries and their relative low cost and ease of configuration. In modern terminology, SRBMs are part of the wider grouping of theatre ballistic missiles, which includes any ballistic missile with a range of less than 3,500 km.

Models

See also
Tactical ballistic missile
Medium-range ballistic missile (MRBM)
Intermediate-range ballistic missile (IRBM)
Intercontinental ballistic missile (ICBM)
Anti-ship ballistic missile (ASBM)
Hypersonic cruise missile

References

Missile types